Pseudis fusca is a species of frog in the family Hylidae. It is endemic to Minas Gerais, Brazil, and only known few localities. Although it is currently considered a valid species, it has also been treated as a subspecies of Pseudis paradoxa.

Description
Adult males measure  and adult females  in snout–vent length. The overall appearance is robust. The head is wider than it is long and the snout is rounded. The tympanum is distinct, elliptical in shape. The eyes are big. The toes are fully webbed. Skin is smooth. Preserved specimens are dorsally brown or grey, with darker markings that do not form any regular pattern.

Habitat and conservation
It can also occur in large water reservoirs. Breeding takes place in pools and streams. It is a locally common species that can suffer from habitat loss caused by agricultural encroachment, infrastructure development, and agricultural pollution. Its presence in protected areas is unknown.

References

fusca
Amphibians of Brazil
Endemic fauna of Brazil
Taxa named by Samuel Garman
Amphibians described in 1883
Taxonomy articles created by Polbot